Amanda Jane Perez (born May 24, 1980) is an American R&B singer-songwriter and record producer.

Personal life

Perez, who is of Mexican descent, was raised in Fort Wayne, Indiana. She grew up in the Waynedale community of Fort Wayne, where she attended North Side High School. She spent her teenage years selling drugs to raise money for her family. She also grew up boxing with boys, helping to mold her tough street persona.

On October 2, 2019, Amanda Perez announced that she and her wife Ana Laura Perez, had a son, named Sebastian King Perez.

Career

Perez was discovered in Fort Wayne, Indiana by talent manager and producer (Mighty)Mike Quinn and was signed to the record label Powerhowse/Silverstone Records in 2001. Her debut album Where U At? was released in 2002 and included the singles "Never" and "Angel". "Never" peaked at No. 10 on the Billboard Hot 100 sales chart, but the album itself did not see much success until it was re-released by Virgin Records to a wider distribution area under the new title, "Angel".  Perez's most popular single to date, "Angel", peaked at No. 20 on the Hot 100 sales chart and No. 3 at Top 40 Radio.

Mighty Mike Quinn of Silverstone/Powerhowse Records directed and produced four music videos for Perez, which all aired on MTV, VH1 and BET. The album was produced by Quinn and co-produced by Powerhowse producer/DJ Tony Palacios. DJ Tony P. was Perez touring DJ during her initial rise to popularity and a former radio employee-friend of Quinn.

Perez notably charted at No. 7 on the popular MTV viewer request show Total Request Live. She has had moderate success since departing from the original producers in 2005.

Subsequently, she took time off to care for her mother who was diagnosed with cancer. In 2004 Quinn's Silverstone/Powerhowse label partnered to release her second album, this time with Virgin Records, as a joint effort.

"I Pray", the title track, was the first single off the album, and would prove to be the last time writer-producer Mike Quinn would work with Perez on an album.  The second single, "Dedicate (Remix)", featured Layzie Bone of Bone Thugs under the direction of Quinn.

Shortly after its release, Perez parted ways with her original label and the writer-producer. Her next album, The Hand of Fate, was to be released on Virgin under Perez's direction, but she was soon released from her contract due to legal conflicts and Virgin's unwillingness to effect Quinn's original agreements.

In 2007 Upstairs Records released a special album dedicated to Perez's mother's death.  The lone single from that album, "Candy Kisses" had success on the Top 40/Rhythmic Chart, peaking at No. 17.

In 2013, Perez and A-Hype Records released the single "Freak For The Weekend", the first single from the album Unexpected.

On October 21, 2016, Perez announced that she was working on her sixth studio album in an interview with Power 98.3. She intended for a December 2016 release but the album process has continued into 2021. She continues to post many clips of material she is working on via her official Facebook, Twitter, and Instagram pages. Several stand alone singles have been released over the upcoming album process including "So Free", "I Know" feat. Dave G., "Did It for Love", "I Get It" feat. Ace, "Ain't the Same", and "Heartache".

In February 2017 Perez announced that she will release a limited edition Greatest Hits album entitled 15 Years of Greatest Hits that will only be available for purchase at her live shows.

Discography

Studio albums

Compilation albums
 15 Years of Greatest Hits (2017)

Singles

"—" denotes a title that did not chart, or was not released in that territory. * denotes a title that was charted on Billboards Bubbling Under Hot 100 chart, an extension of the Billboard Hot 100.

Music videos

References

American contemporary R&B singers
Living people
American musicians of Mexican descent
Hispanic and Latino American musicians
1980 births
21st-century American women singers
21st-century American singers
American lesbian musicians
LGBT Hispanic and Latino American people
20th-century American LGBT people
21st-century American LGBT people
People from Fort Wayne, Indiana
Hispanic and Latino American women singers